Imperial Palace may refer to:

Palaces
Tokyo Imperial Palace (Kōkyo), Tokyo, Japan
Kyoto Imperial Palace, Kyoto, Japan
Imperial Palace of Goslar, Goslar, Germany

Hotels
IP Casino Resort Spa, Biloxi, Mississippi; formerly the Imperial Palace Biloxi
The Linq, Las Vegas, Nevada; formerly the Imperial Palace Hotel and Casino

Other Uses
Imperial Palace (novel), a 1930 novel by Arnold Bennett

See also
Kaiserpfalz (Imperial Palace), castles which served as temporary, secondary seats of power for the Holy Roman Emperor
Forbidden City, Beijing, China, designated by UNESCO as the "Imperial Palace of the Ming and Qing Dynasties"
Imperial City, Huế, a walled palace in Huế, Vietnam